Micklethwaite is a hamlet in Cumbria, England, close to the Lake District.
It is situated to the north east of Wigton.

References

External links
 Cumbria County History Trust: Thursby (nb: provisional research only – see Talk page)

Hamlets in Cumbria
Allerdale